Japan has a system of recycling marks, which indicate and classify recyclable materials.

They are similar to the resin identification codes, in that they have surrounding arrows, with text inside to indicate the type of material.

Rather than using the triangular recycling symbol for all materials, with differing text, the shape of the arrows also varies, which allows them to be distinguished at a glance.

See also

 Recycling symbol
 Green Dot (symbol)
 Recycling codes

Recycling in Japan
Consumer symbols